There have been two baronetcies created for persons with the surname Lucas:  one in the Baronetage of England and one in the Baronetage of the United Kingdom.

The Lucas Baronetcy, of Fenton in the County of Lincoln, was created in the Baronetage of England on 20 May 1644 for Gervase Lucas. He fought as a Royalist in the Civil War and served as Governor of Bombay from 1666 to 1667. The title became extinct on his death in 1667.

The Lucas Baronetcy, of Ashtead Park in the County of Surrey and of Lowestoft in the County of Suffolk, was created in the Baronetage of the United Kingdom on 25 July 1887 for Thomas Lucas. For his services in the building trade with the company the Lucas Brothers. As of 2007 the presumed fifth and present Baronet has not successfully proven his succession and is therefore not on the Official Roll of the Baronetage, with the baronetcy considered dormant. For more information, follow this link. The family seat was Warnham Court, near Horsham, in the County of Sussex.

Lucas baronets, of Fenton (1644)
Sir Gervase Lucas, 1st Baronet (1611–1667)

Lucas baronets, of Ashtead Park and of Lowestoft (1887)

Sir Thomas Charles Delight Hughes Lucas, 1st Baronet (1822–1902)
Sir Arthur Lucas, 2nd Baronet (1853–1915)
Sir Edward Lingard Delight Lucas, 3rd Baronet (1860–1936)
Major Sir Jocelyn Lucas KBE MC, 4th Baronet (1889–1980) 
Sir Thomas Edward Gubbins Lucas, 5th Baronet (1930-) 
The heir apparent is the present holder's son Stephen Ralph James Lucas (1965-).

The heir apparent's heir apparent is his son Samuel Edward James Lucas (1999-).

Notes

References
Kidd, Charles, Williamson, David (editors). Debrett's Peerage and Baronetage (1990 edition). New York: St Martin's Press, 1990, 

Lucas
Baronetcies in the Baronetage of the United Kingdom
Dormant baronetcies
1644 establishments in England